Sağır is a surname. Notable people with the surname include:

Nezir Sağır (born 1983), Turkish weightlifter 
Taner Sağır (born 1985), Turkish weightlifter

Turkish-language surnames